Harry Wainman (born 1947) is an English former professional footballer who played as a goalkeeper from 1963 to 1977. He played 420 times for Grimsby Town and also spent 9 games on loan at Rochdale between 1972 and 1973.

Wainman retired in 1977 through injury, and went on to run a sports shop in Grimsby and later a hotel called the Ivys in Cleethorpes

Honours

Grimsby Town
Supporters Player of the Season: 1972, 1976
 England Youth International

References

1943 births
Living people
English footballers
English Football League players
Grimsby Town F.C. players
Rochdale A.F.C. players
Footballers from Kingston upon Hull
Association football goalkeepers